In 2020, floods have affected South Asia due to heavy monsoon rains. The floods caused $105 billion USD of damage ($88.5 billion in India, $15 billion in Sri Lanka, and $1.5 billion in Pakistan), making it the costliest standalone flood in modern history, and the ninth costliest disaster of all time. In addition there were 6,511 fatalities, the most reported in a flood since Cyclone Sidr in 2007. Floods continued in 2021 and 2022.

Impact

Afghanistan
In April, floods killed at least 11 people and damaged around 700 houses. Between July and August, floods had affected around half of Afghanistan, killing 190 people and damaged around 2,000 homes.

Bangladesh
In May, Cyclone Amphan caused 20 deaths in Bangladesh. In July, floods struck again, affecting 3.3 million people, and killing 260 more people.

India
Cyclone Amphan killed at least 86 people in West Bengal, India.
From July to October, over 5,000 people died in flooding.

Nepal

From June to September, floods in Nepal killed at least 401 people. The Kathmandu Post reported that the floods were some of the worst in the country’s history.

Pakistan
At least 410 people died in floods in Pakistan. Over 310,000 homes were damaged by flood water, causing $1.5 billion USD.

Sri Lanka
At least 133 people have died when floods damaged 3 million homes and caused $15 billion USD.

References

Floods in India
2020 in India
Floods in Bangladesh
2020 in Bangladesh
Floods in Afghanistan
2020 in Afghanistan
Floods in Sri Lanka
2020 in Sri Lanka
Floods in Pakistan
2020 in Pakistan
2020 floods in Asia